Natasha Smith may refer to:

 Natasha Smith (rugby league), Canadian rugby league player
 Natasha Smith (diplomat), Australian High Commissioner to Canada